The Kawasaki Heavy Industries & CSR Qingdao Sifang C151A is the fourth generation electric multiple unit rolling stock in operation on the North–South and East–West lines of Singapore's Mass Rapid Transit (MRT) system, manufactured by Kawasaki Heavy Industries (KHI) and CRRC Qingdao Sifang under Contract 151A. Their introduction to the network has increased the capacity of both lines by 15%. 

They are the last batch of rolling stock on the two lines to be painted in the "Blackbird" livery. Developed from the KNS C751B sets, further developments of the type include the C151B and C151C featuring design updates and changes. The C151A was the first rolling stock on the MRT network to be manufactured in China. The initial contract of 22 trainsets of 6 cars each was awarded to KHI and Sifang by the Land Transport Authority. 

In 2013, a further order of 13 trainsets under was placed, with all 35 trainsets in revenue service as of 2014. In 2016, an investigative news report from Hong Kong's FactWire alleged that C151A trainsets were discreetly being shipped back to Qingdao for rectification due to multiple defects, including an exploding battery and cracks on trains. The Singapore government subsequently acknowledged the trains were returned for rectification works, and have since published official statements to address FactWire's specific allegations.

History
On May 6, 2009, the Land Transport Authority announced that KHI and Sifang had won over Hyundai Rotem, Bombardier Transportation and Mitsubishi Heavy Industries to secure the contract at a cost of S$369 million, despite Hyundai Rotem offering the lowest bid at S$323 million for the order of 22 trainsets under Batch 1. Sifang handled the manufacturing and testing of the rolling stock, while KHI oversaw the project and design. The C151A contract was the first successful joint venture between these two companies in the international market.

With the delivery of C151A trainsets, trains were actually operated on the East–West Line until October 2013. C151As were temporarily suspended from the North–South Line during the MRT disruption in 2011, starting from 7 May 2012 all the way until 23 October 2013. SMRT engineers detected arcing problems on one of the C151As, but no evidence was shown that it was the root cause of the service suspension in 2015.

During the suspension of the C151A running on the North–South Line, SMRT had investigated and found impurities in aluminium bodywork caused the cracks found in structural components, including the sub-floor, which is a compartment located under passenger floor. It's role is to hold equipment box and electrical wires and bolster function parts connecting the car body to the bogie. Affected trainsets were sent back to China progressively between July 2014 and January 2020, before the COVID-19 pandemic.

Tender
The tender for trains under the contract turnkey 151A was closed in January 2009. The tender results were published in May 2009.

Equipment

Main propulsion controller
The C151A trains are the third commuter type Electric Multiple Unit (EMU) made in Japan to feature electric systems fully manufactured by Fuji Electric. Propulsion is controlled by VVVF Inverter with 2-level IGBT semiconductor controller, rated at 415 kV. Each inverter unit controls two motors on one bogie (1C2M), and one motor car features two of such units. Motors are three-phrase AC induction type, model MLR109, with a maximum output of 140 kW. However, the main difference is that the traction for the trains is higher pitched than the ones from C751B trains which are lower pitched.

Bogies
The C151A trains use the monolink axle box type bolsterless air spring bogie. There are no major technical differences between a trailer and motor car bogie other than additional electrical components for the latter.

Auxiliary systems
A break from tradition, the C151A trains features auxiliary inverters for its electrical systems on all six cars of the train. Previously, auxiliary inverters were mounted only on motor cars. The VVVF Inverter is controlled by IGBT semiconductors and rated at 80 kV. A battery charger is built with the inverter and provides 16 kW output.

Train formation

The configuration of a C151A in revenue service is DT–M1–M2+M2–M1–DT

The car numbers of the trains range from x501 to x570, where x depends on the carriage type. Individual cars are assigned a 4 digit serial number. A complete six-car trainset consists of an identical twin set of one driving trailer (DT) and two motor (M) cars permanently coupled together. For example, set 501/502 consists of carriages 3501, 1501, 2501, 2502, 1502 and 3502.

 The first digit identifies the car number, where the first car has a 3, the second has a 1 & the third has a 2.
 The second digit is always a 5, part of the identification numbers
 The third digit and fourth digit are the train identification numbers. A full-length train of 6 cars have 2 different identification numbers. For example, 521/522 (normal coupling) or 521/540 (cross-coupling).
 Kawasaki and CSR Qingdao Sifang built sets 501–570.

Operational problems

On 5 July 2016, a Hong Kong-based non-profit news organization FactWire had broken the news of the C151A trains suffering from multiple defects relating to Chinese-made materials and posted the entire investigative works in YouTube.

Factwire allegations

These are the list of allegations mentioned in their YouTube video since C151A entered into revenue service in 2011 (27 May 2011).

This list compiles the initial response from the authorities are compiled from the first SMRT press release on 5 July 2016, 4:30pm (GMT+8) by SMRT Trains managing director Lee Ling Wee  as well as the first Land Transport Authority press release at an hour after first SMRT's press release. and also the subsequent official position on Singapore government's online FAQ portal 'Factually' which quotes sources from the Facebook page of Land Transport Authority hours after the initial press release.

Reactions

This incident was a source of public concern among Hong Kongers because subway operator MTR had ordered fleets of a new train from the same manufacturer CSR Sifang. The news was quickly reported in other Hong Kong media. The incident also created a public uproar in Singapore, generating a public reaction. Some of these discussions included criticism of the Land Transport Authority (LTA) and SMRT for the cover-up about the defective trains, while others questioned the quality of the Chinese-made trains. The LTA released more technical details on 6 July 2016 claiming that 5 of the 26 defective trains had been rectified, including photos illustrating the 'hair-line crack'. The authority also named an independent third-party assessor, TUV Rheinland who shared the same opinion that the defects are "not safety-critical".

During the same period, a rumour posted on 4 February 2015 alleging misconduct of CSR Sifang faking technical data involving almost 70 people from multiple departments since November 2010 for failing to meet the standards set by Kawasaki Heavy Industries gained traction amongst the public. The consortium refuted the rumor on 7 July 2016 and threatened to take legal actions. The LTA also publicly dismissed the allegations in a press statement. The link to the original rumor was deleted soon after the response from the authorities. On 7 July 2016, the LTA also stated that "no brackets were added at any time to the underframe" in order to refute a subsequent FactWire report claim. LTA also stated that it "considered that the contractor was able to quickly identify the cause of the defects, take responsibility and carry out the necessary action promptly to rectify the fault" and gave the consortium the "highest quality score" as the basis for awarded them subsequent train contracts (C151C and CT251) in 2015 despite the defects were discovered since. The contract for C151B trains had been awarded to the same consortium in 2012, prior to the knowledge about the faults being known.

On 9 July 2016, a Singapore-based alternative media republished a CaiXin Online article originally published in March 2016 by the China Railway Construction Corporation blaming the China Railway Rolling Stock Corporation for the decline of quality standards. According to the former, 60% of all railway incidents in China and 90% of all railway disruptions during 2015 can be attributed to CRRC manufactured trains not meeting quality or maintenance standards, with 210 instances resulting in death or injuries. The equivalent of the English article is also provided by CaiXin Online as well.

Political furor in Singapore
The incident became a political issue as opposition politician Gerald Giam from the Workers' Party questioned the transport authority for awarding the consortium a "top quality score", among other statements in his Facebook page. The party later issued a second statement that their MPs would file 17 questions in Parliament about the issue.

Official statement from Transport Minister
On 12 July 2016, Transport Minister Khaw Boon Wan released an extensive statement about this issue. These are the key points that Khaw have made:

The reason that this incident was not reported earlier in 2013 is because going public for something that was "not a major event" might have caused unnecessary panic to the layman since any engineers would have known that not all cracks are the same. However, he admitted that sometimes routine matters can be spun out of control, just like in this incident. 
Land Transport Authority would have consulted with Ministry of Transport and go public if this incident happens to be a safety issue OR affected train capacity even if the incident does not affect safety because they need to explain the slowing down on the goal of increasing mass rail transit capacity.In this case given that only one train is sent for rectification at a time, the train availability is not affected at all since the East–West Line and North–South Line has a total fleet of 140 trains (As of 2016) while only 124 trains are needed to meet the operational demand.
He said that the entire train would be removed from service even if just one out of the 6 train cars formed cracks.
Explained that the reason for Kawasaki-Sifang to win subsequent tenders like CT251 trains for the upcoming (As of 2016) Thomson-East Coast Line is because the consortium showed a high level of responsiveness and strong sense of responsibility in addressing the issue and the authorities are satisfied that the issue was resolved conclusively.
Explained that a total of 4 tenders including Kawasaki-Sifang out of the 6 planned to assemble their trains in China with Hyundai Rotem and Construcciones y Auxiliar de Ferrocarriles the exceptions who will assemble their trains in South Korea and Spain respectively should they have won the CT251 tender.

Reaction from the Analysts and FactWire after Minister statement
Senior Transport Correspondent for Straits Times, Christopher Tan published an article on 14 July 2016 in a response to the entire saga. He started with both LTA and the train manufacturer are addressing the flaws head-on deserves credit but took an issue with how the authorities communicated with the public over the debacle did little to restore confidence. Specifically the points mentioned were:
The oldest rolling stock C151 does not have cracks despite nearly 30 years of service and the first batch of trains used in the Singapore's most problematic railway, Bukit Panjang LRT Line showed cracks only after 16 years of service. Therefore, he said that the crack issue surfaced on the C151As are not routine as what minister have said earlier.
Transport Ministry risks giving the public an impression of taking the issue lightly by comparing the hairline cracks occurred on the trains to those that frequently appear on a newly plastered wall.
Took issue with the train manufacturer for not showing public remorse because no apology was made while threatening to take legal actions against people who spread the rumors critical of them.
Engineers knows that impurities in aluminium-alloy is a grave concern in any industry as its durability is certain to be compromised over time. The authorities had earlier admitted that the cause of hair-line cracks in train car body is due to impurities.
Questioned the authorities were quick to declare that no reviews are necessary despite Sifang was rejected by Massachusetts transport officials due to the technical, manufacturing and quality assurance components of its bid were "unacceptable" in 2014 among other issues surfaced by rival Chinese railway manufacture in the overseas projects as well as the authorities had appeared to downplay the episode.
On 14 July 2016, FactWire made a Facebook post which regretted the false statements that Singapore minister had made 2 days ago. Specifically, FactWire regrets the minister has suggested that FactWire could be part of politically motivated anti-China factions in Hong Kong and as a result Singapore become a convenient bullet and collateral damage during the press release on 12 July 2016. FactWire also reiterates that it is an entirely crowded funded news agency being independent of any commercial or political interests.

Incidents
On 15 November 2017 at approximately 8.18am, 2 C151A trains collided at Joo Koon MRT station. 29 passengers were conveyed to various hospitals following the incident and a further 7 walked in themselves. This is the second of such incidents after 5 August 1993, with the first being when 2 C151 trains collided at Clementi.

References

External links

Mass Rapid Transit (Singapore) rolling stock
Kawasaki multiple units
Train-related introductions in 2011
750 V DC multiple units
CRRC multiple units